Dąbrowica  (Dubrovytsia) is a village in the administrative district of Gmina Ulanów, within Nisko County, Subcarpathian Voivodeship, in south-eastern Poland. The village is located in the historical region Galicia.

References

Villages in Nisko County